Mary Elizabeth Fisher  (born 16 January 1993) is a New Zealand para swimmer. She represented New Zealand at the 2012 Summer Paralympics in London and the 2016 Summer Paralympics in Rio de Janeiro, combined winning two gold medals, two silver medals and a bronze medal.

Fisher was born in Lower Hutt and grew up in the nearby Upper Hutt suburb of Silverstream. She was born with the rare genetic condition aniridia, resulting in low vision which deteriorated as a teenager. She attended Silverstream Primary School, Maidstone Intermediate and Heretaunga College. She is a student at the Wellington campus of Massey University.

Fisher began swimming for enjoyment as a nine year old and trained at the Upper Hutt Swim Club until completing high school in 2010. Her goal of swimming at the London 2012 Paralympics was bolstered by meeting coach Luke Clark and she moved to Wellington city to train under his guidance.  After his departure overseas Fisher relocated to the North Shore in Auckland following the 2015 IPC Swimming World Championships in Glasgow. She is classified S11 for totally blind swimmers in freestyle, backstroke and breaststroke; SB11 for breaststroke, and SM11 for individual medley.

At the 2012 Summer Paralympics, Fisher won the gold medal in the 200 m individual medley SM11 in a world record time of 2:46.91. She also won silver medals in the 100 m freestyle and the 100 m backstroke, and the bronze medal in the 50 m freestyle S11.

She won five gold medals and a silver at the 2013 IPC Swimming World Championships in Montreal.

In 2015, she won three gold and two silver medals at the IPC Swimming World Championships in Glasgow, qualifying her for the 2016 Summer Paralympics in Rio de Janeiro. She was officially confirmed to represent New Zealand at the Paralympics on 5 May 2016.

At the 2016 Summer Paralympics, Fisher won the gold medal in the women's 100m backstroke S11 in a world record time of 1:17.96.

In the 2013 New Year Honours, Fisher was appointed a Member of the New Zealand Order of Merit for services to swimming. She was named 2014 Disabled Sportsperson of the Year at the annual Halberg Awards.

Fisher announced her retirement from competitive swimming in November 2018.

Personal bests

References

External links
  (archive)
 
 Meet Our Paralympians: Mary Fisher (from the archives) – Attitude Live video profile

1993 births
Living people
Sportspeople from Upper Hutt
New Zealand female swimmers
Paralympic swimmers of New Zealand
S11-classified Paralympic swimmers
Swimmers at the 2012 Summer Paralympics
Swimmers at the 2016 Summer Paralympics
Medalists at the 2012 Summer Paralympics
Medalists at the 2016 Summer Paralympics
Paralympic gold medalists for New Zealand
Paralympic silver medalists for New Zealand
Paralympic bronze medalists for New Zealand
People educated at Heretaunga College
World record holders in paralympic swimming
Members of the New Zealand Order of Merit
Medalists at the World Para Swimming Championships
Paralympic medalists in swimming